Dzikowiec may refer to the following places in Poland:
Dzikowiec, Lower Silesian Voivodeship (south-west Poland)
Dzikowiec, Subcarpathian Voivodeship (south-east Poland, formerly Stary Dzikowiec)